Rogério Márcio Botelho known as Rogério Gaúcho or just Gaúcho (born 28 September 1979) is a Brazilian former footballer.

Football career

He joined A PFG powerhouse Levski Sofia in 2001, making his league debut on 4 March in the 3:0 win over Beroe. Gaúcho signed a contract until the end of 2006 with União Barbarense on 20 April 2005. He left for SK Sigma Olomouc in August 2005. In January 2006, he signed for Slavia Praha.

Honours
Levski Sofia
 Bulgarian A PFG: 2000–01

SK Slovan Bratislava
 Slovak Super Liga: 2008–09
 Slovak Cup: 2009–10
 Slovak Super Cup: 2009

References

External links
Brazilian FA Database  

1979 births
Living people
Brazilian footballers
Brazilian expatriate footballers
Expatriate footballers in Bulgaria
FC Senec players
ŠK Slovan Bratislava players
PFC Levski Sofia players
SK Slavia Prague players
PFC Krylia Sovetov Samara players
Expatriate footballers in Russia
Russian Premier League players
Sportspeople from Paraná (state)
First Professional Football League (Bulgaria) players
Slovak Super Liga players
Expatriate footballers in Slovakia
Brazilian expatriate sportspeople in Slovakia
Association football forwards
Expatriate footballers in the Czech Republic
Brazilian expatriate sportspeople in the Czech Republic
Expatriate footballers in Spain
Brazilian expatriate sportspeople in Bulgaria